Kevin Rowland (born 17 August 1953) is a British singer and musician best known as the frontman for the pop band Dexys Midnight Runners (currently called Dexys). The band had several hits in the early 1980s, the most notable being "Geno" and "Come On Eileen", both of which reached number one on the UK Singles Chart.

Early life
Rowland was born in Wednesfield, Wolverhampton, on 17 August 1953 to Irish parents from Crossmolina, County Mayo, Ireland, and he lived for three years in Ireland between the ages of one and four before returning to Wolverhampton. The family moved to Harrow when he was 11 years old and he left school at the age of 15.

Before his music career, Rowland worked as a hairdresser.

Career
Rowland's first group, Lucy & the Lovers, were influenced by Roxy Music and turned out to be short-lived. His next project, the punk rock act the Killjoys, were slightly more successful, releasing the single "Johnny Won't Get To Heaven" in 1977.

Alienated by the punk scene, Rowland, together with Killjoys guitarist Kevin Archer, formed a new soul-influenced group, Dexys Midnight Runners. Many of the group's songs were inspired by Rowland's Irish ancestry and were recognisable through Rowland's idiosyncratic vocal style. On forming the band Rowland thought it was "important to have a vocal style", he later recalled, "and I had the idea of putting that 'crying' voice on", partly inspired by General Johnson of Chairmen of the Board. The band had several hit singles, such as "Come On Eileen" (1982).

At the end of the 1980s, Rowland wanted to explore different songwriting, and Dexys Midnight Runners began recording more "introspective, mournful" music. The new material was unsuccessful; Dexys Midnight Runners were dropped by their label and disbanded. Rowland said: "I’d been too confident, too arrogant. I thought everyone would hear our new music and go: 'Wow.'" He became reliant on drugs, lost his money, and entered rehab.

When Dexys disbanded in 1987, Rowland recorded a solo album, The Wanderer, which, together with its three singles, was a commercial failure. His next release was not until 1999 when he recorded a collection of interpretations of classic songs called My Beauty, the album cover of which depicted a heavily made-up Rowland in a dress and lingerie.

In 2003, Rowland reformed Dexys Midnight Runners—featuring only one other original member, bassist Pete Williams, who fulfilled the role as Rowland's co-vocalist—and embarked on a successful comeback tour backed up with a greatest hits compilation album including two newly recorded songs, "Manhood" and "My Life in England". Both of these new songs were radio tested by the record label, but neither received enough airplay to be considered for release.

In 2012 Rowland re-launched Dexys Midnight Runners as "Dexys" with a new album One Day I'm Going to Soar accompanied by a UK tour. Rowland has always identified strongly with his Irish background and in 2016 Dexys released their fifth album, Let the Record Show: Dexys Do Irish and Country Soul, featuring interpretations of Irish folk songs such as "Women of Ireland" and "Carrickfergus", among others.

Since around 2005, Rowland has hosted a popular DJ tour in clubs and venues throughout the UK. His eclectic set includes his personal favourites, vintage soul and pop numbers from such notables as T-Rex, Roxy Music, and Harold Melvin & the Blue Notes.

In summer of 2020 Rowland released a new video for the song Rag Doll, a promo which features his grandson Roo. In September 2020, My Beauty was re-released by Cherry Red Records and finally became a UK chart hit in October, peaking at number 73 in the albums chart.

Acclaim
According to Paul Moody in Uncut in 2007, "Rowland—as singer and songwriter with Dexys Midnight Runners—gave us some of the great pop moments. From the bolshy vision of Searching for the Young Soul Rebels through the celtic-gumbo of Too-Rye-Ay and '85's neglected masterpiece, Don't Stand Me Down, his is a towering contribution to British music, both visually and musically."

Discography

Studio albums

Singles

Guest appearances

References

External links

1953 births
Living people
English new wave musicians
English people of Irish descent
Dexys Midnight Runners members
musicians from Wolverhampton
Creation Records artists
Male new wave singers
English rock guitarists
English rock singers
English male singer-songwriters
English male guitarists
People from Crossmolina